Three regiments of the British Army have been numbered the 81st Regiment of Foot:

81st Regiment of Foot (Invalids), raised in 1757 and renumbered the 71st in 1764
81st Regiment of Foot (Aberdeenshire Highland Regiment), numbered the 81st in 1778
81st Regiment of Foot (Loyal Lincoln Volunteers), raised in 1793